2015 Maiduguri suicide bombing may refer to: 

January 2015 Maiduguri suicide bombing
March 2015 Maiduguri suicide bombing
September 2015 Borno State bombings
October 2015 Maiduguri and Yola bombings
December 2015 Madagali and Maiduguri bombings